Robert Dalziel was a Scottish amateur football inside left who made over 110 appearances in the Scottish League for Queen's Park. He also played for Third Lanark and Kilmarnock.

References

Scottish footballers
Scottish Football League players
Queen's Park F.C. players
Place of birth missing
Year of birth missing
Date of death missing
Third Lanark A.C. players
Kilmarnock F.C. players
Association football inside forwards
Scotland amateur international footballers
Craigmark Burntonians F.C. players